Francisco Silvela y Le Vielleuze (15 December 1843, in Madrid – 29 May 1905, in Madrid) was a Spanish politician who became Prime Minister of Spain on 3 May 1899, succeeding Práxedes Mateo Sagasta. He served in this capacity until 22 October 1900.

Silvela also served a second term from 6 December 1902 to 20 July 1903, in which he succeeded another one of Práxedes Mateo Sagasta's many separate terms as prime minister.

Francisco Silvela belonged to the Conservative Party led by Antonio Cánovas del Castillo. He became leader of the Party after the assassination of Cánovas in 1897. His government concluded the German–Spanish Treaty (1899), selling the remainder of the Spanish East Indies.

Francisco Silvela named the general Arsenio Linares y Pombo, who had fought in the Spanish–American War, Minister of War in 1900.

Francisco Silvela withdrew from politics in 1903 and appointed Antonio Maura as his successor. He died in Madrid in 1905.

Family
Francisco Silvela married Amelia Loring Heredia; their children were Jorge and Tomas.

|-

1843 births
1905 deaths
Politicians from Madrid
Conservative Party (Spain) politicians
Prime Ministers of Spain
Foreign ministers of Spain
Justice ministers of Spain
Members of the Congress of Deputies of the Spanish Restoration
Leaders of political parties in Spain
Members of the Royal Spanish Academy